The Pirulil Range is a mountain range located in the southern half of Chiloé Island. It is located along the Pacific coast and forms part of the larger Chilean Coast Range. It northern boundary is the Cucao Lake, beyond of which Cordillera del Piuchén rises. To the south the range ends at Corcovado Gulf.

See also
Nahuelbuta Range
Valdivian Coastal Range
Pelada Range

Mountain ranges of Chile
Landforms of Los Lagos Region
Chilean Coast Range